Pollyanna is a 1913 novel by American author. Eleanor H. Porter, considered a classic of children's literature. The book's success led to Porter soon writing a sequel, Pollyanna Grows Up (1915). Eleven more Pollyanna sequels, known as "Glad Books", were later published, most of them written by Elizabeth Borton or Harriet Lummis Smith. Further sequels followed, including Pollyanna Plays the Game by Colleen L. Reece, published in 1997. Due to the book's fame, "Pollyanna" has become a byword for someone who, like the title character, has an unfailingly optimistic outlook; a subconscious bias towards the positive is often described as the Pollyanna principle. Despite the current common use of the term to mean "excessively cheerful", Pollyanna and her father played the glad game as a method of coping with the real difficulties and sorrows that, along with luck and joy, shape every life.

Pollyanna has been adapted for film several times. Some of the best known are the 1920 version starring Mary Pickford, and Disney's 1960 version starring child actress Hayley Mills, who won a special Oscar for the role.

Plot
The title character is Pollyanna Whittier, an eleven-year-old orphan who goes to live in the fictional town of Beldingsville, Vermont, with her wealthy but stern and cold spinster Aunt Polly Harrington, who does not want to take in Pollyanna but feels it as her duty to her late sister Jennifer. Pollyanna's philosophy of life centers on what she calls "The Glad Game", an optimistic and positive attitude she learned from her father. The game consists of finding something to be glad about in every situation, no matter how bleak it may be. It originated in an incident one Christmas when Pollyanna, who was hoping for a doll in the missionary barrel, found only a pair of crutches inside. Making the game up on the spot, Pollyanna's father taught her to look at the good side of things—in this case, to be glad about the crutches because she did not need to use them.

With this philosophy, and her own sunny personality and sincere, sympathetic soul, Pollyanna brings so much gladness to her aunt's dispirited New England town that she transforms it into a pleasant place to live. The Glad Game shields her from her aunt's stern attitude: when Aunt Polly puts her in a stuffy attic room without carpets or pictures, she exults at the beautiful view from the high window; when she tries to "punish" her niece for being late to dinner by sentencing her to a meal of bread and milk in the kitchen with the servant Nancy, Pollyanna thanks her rapturously because she likes bread and milk, and she likes Nancy.

Soon Pollyanna teaches some of Beldingsville's most troubled inhabitants to "play the game" as well, from Mrs. Snow, a querulous invalid, to Mr. Pendleton, a miserly bachelor who lives all alone in a cluttered mansion. Aunt Polly, too—finding herself helpless before Pollyanna's buoyant refusal to be downcast—gradually begins to thaw, although she resists the Glad Game longer than anyone else.

Eventually, however, even Pollyanna's robust optimism is put to the test when she is struck by a car and loses the use of her legs. At first, she does not realize the seriousness of her situation, but her spirits plummet when she is told what happened to her. After that, she lies in bed, unable to find anything to be glad about. Then the townspeople begin calling at Aunt Polly's house, eager to let Pollyanna know how much her encouragement has improved their lives; and Pollyanna decides she can still be glad that she at least had her legs. The novel ends with Aunt Polly marrying her former lover Dr. Chilton and Pollyanna being sent to a hospital, where she learns to walk again and is able to appreciate the use of her legs far more as a result of being temporarily disabled and unable to walk well.

Influence
The quote "When you look for the bad in mankind expecting to find it, you surely will" appears in the 1960 Disney version, where it is attributed to Abraham Lincoln. However, the original quote ("When you look for the bad, expecting it, you will get it") is actually from the book, where it appears without attribution.

As a result of the novel's success, the adjective "Pollyannaish" and the noun "Pollyannaism" became popular terms for a personality type characterised by irrepressible optimism evident in the face of even the most adverse or discouraging of circumstances. It is sometimes used pejoratively, referring to someone whose optimism is excessive to the point of naïveté or refusing to accept the facts of an unfortunate situation. This pejorative use can be heard in the introduction of the 1930 George and Ira Gershwin song "But Not For Me": "I never want to hear from any cheerful pollyannas/who tell me fate supplies a mate/that's all bananas" (performed by Judy Garland in the 1943 movie Girl Crazy).

The word "pollyanna" may also be used colloquially to denote a holiday gift exchange more typically known as Secret Santa, especially in Philadelphia and the surrounding areas.

Pollyanna is still available in reprint editions. At the height of her popularity, Pollyanna was known as "The Glad Girl", and Parker Brothers even created The Glad Game, a board game. The Glad Game, a type of Parcheesi, was made and sold from 1915 to 1967 in various versions, similar to the popular UK board game Ludo. The board game was later licensed by Parker Brothers but has been discontinued for many years. A Broadway adaptation was mounted in 1916 titled Pollyanna Whittier, The Glad Girl. Helen Hayes was the star.

Author Jerome (Jerry) Griswold analysed Pollyanna together with juvenile 'heroes' in several well-known children's books, e.g., Little Lord Fauntleroy, Rebecca of Sunnybrook Farm (both also portrayed by Pickford on film) and The Secret Garden from the era known as the Golden Age of Children's Books (approximately the American Civil War to World War I). With reference to the Theory of the Three Lives of the Child Hero, he posits that, in Pollyanna, clear oedipal tensions exist, albeit in disguised or projected forms, in the relationships between the child, her Aunt and the principal male adult characters, which are only resolved by the Aunt marrying Dr. Chilton at the end of the story. He calls Pollyanna 'a complex novel replete with disguises' and sees Pollyanna, not as a naïve child but, rather, as a gifted individual with the ability to direct her extreme optimism and good-naturedness (for the good) towards the manipulating of the negative, worldly, cynical or disillusioned emotions of the adults that inhabit her life.

"Glad Clubs" appear to have been popular for a while; however, it is questionable if they were ever more than a publicity gimmick. Glad Clubs may have been simply a means to popularize The Glad Game as a method for coping with the vicissitudes of life such as loss, disappointment, and distress. Nevertheless, at least one "glad club" existed as recently as 2008, in Denver, Colorado.

In 2002 the citizens of Littleton, New Hampshire unveiled a bronze statue in honor of Eleanor H. Porter, author of the Pollyanna books and one of the town's most famous residents. The statue depicts a smiling Pollyanna, arms flung wide in greeting. Littleton also hosts a festival known as "The Official Pollyanna Glad Day" every summer.

The celebrated American science fiction writer Ray Bradbury described himself as "Janus, the two-faced god who is half Pollyanna and half Cassandra, warning of the future and perhaps living too much in the past—a combination of both".

In a 1973 State of the Union message to Congress Richard M. Nixon wrote, "I believe there is always a sensible middle ground between the Cassandras and the Pollyannas. We must take our stand upon that ground."

The video game series Mother (marketed in the U.S. as EarthBound) and Super Smash Bros. series feature a song in every game (except Super Smash Bros. for the Nintendo 64 and 3DS) entitled "Pollyanna (I Believe in You)". The song was also labelled "Mother 2" in Brawl and Melee, before being altered to use the song's existing standard title. The song is a reference to the novel; a lyrical version produced and released on a soundtrack CD reinforces the reference in the lyrics.

List of Pollyanna books

Glad Books
Eleanor Porter
Pollyanna: The First Glad Book
Pollyanna Grows Up: The Second Glad Book
Harriet Lummis Smith
Pollyanna of the Orange Blossoms: The Third Glad Book
Pollyanna's Jewels: The Fourth Glad Book
Pollyanna the game 
Pollyanna's Debt of Honor: The Fifth Glad Book
Pollyanna's Western Adventure: The Sixth Glad Book
Elizabeth Borton
Pollyanna in Hollywood: The Seventh Glad Book
Pollyanna's Castle in Mexico: The Eighth Glad Book
Pollyanna's Door to Happiness: The Ninth Glad Book
Pollyanna's Golden Horseshoe: The Tenth Glad Book
Margaret Piper Chalmers
Pollyanna's Protegee: The Eleventh Glad Book
Virginia May Moffitt
Pollyanna at Six Star Ranch: The Twelfth Glad Book
Pollyanna of Magic Valley: The Thirteenth Glad Book
Elizabeth Borton
Pollyanna and the Secret Mission: The Fourteenth Glad Book

Further sequels
Reece, Colleen L.
Pollyanna Comes Home
Pollyanna Plays the Game

Adaptations

1915 play

In 1915, Catherine Chisholm Cushing published Pollyanna: The Glad Girl, a four-act comedy which was produced with great success in Philadelphia starring Patricia Collinge as Pollyanna.  A critic at the time wrote that: "Mrs. Cushing has slashed and sliced and revised and twisted the story of Pollyanna and her infectious gladness until it has become swift-moving, intensely dramatic and very real."  In 1918 and 1919 the play toured the U.S. and Canada with 19-year-old Viola Harper (nee Harpman) in the title role.

1920 film

The 1920 American silent melodrama/comedy film Pollyanna starred Mary Pickford and was directed by Paul Powell. It was Pickford's first motion picture for United Artists. It became a major success and would be regarded as one of Pickford's most defining pictures.  The film grossed $1.1 million (approximately $ today).

1960 film

A Walt Disney film, Pollyanna, was released in 1960, starring English actress Hayley Mills in the title role (which made her a Hollywood star and led to a Disney contract). The 1960 film was shot at the McDonald Mansion (aka Mableton Mansion) on McDonald Avenue in what was then the small town of Santa Rosa, California. The Pendergast castle was filmed at Stags’ Leap Winery. It was directed by David Swift.

The film was a major hit for the Disney Studios. It also marked the last film appearance of Hollywood actor Adolphe Menjou, who played the hermit-like Mr. Pendergast, who is eventually brought out of his shell by Pollyanna and her friend Jimmy.

The film was not very faithful to the novel. One marked difference from the book (and the 1920 silent version with Mary Pickford) was the treatment of Pollyanna's accident. Originally, she is paralyzed when she is hit by a car, while in the Disney film, the accident occurs because she is sneaking home from a local festival she has been forbidden to attend, and falls when she tries to re-enter her room by climbing the tree outside her bedroom window. The characters have been altered; in the book Aunt Polly does not run the town (named "Harrington" in the movie and "Beldingsville" in the book) and is hardly as ruthless or controlling. The idea of the orphanage and the bazaar with Dr. Chilton and the townsfolk opposing the charity of the rich are not found in the novel. The movie gives Jimmy Bean a far bigger role than the book does. Mr. Pendergast (Mr. Pendleton in the book) also has a more prominent role. The ending has been altered slightly: it is never made clear whether or not she is able to walk again (unlike the original book, the film never had a sequel).

1971 film
The Turkish musical drama comedy film Hayat Sevince Güzel (literally: "Loving makes life beautiful"), is loosely based on Pollyanna. The film stars Turkish actress Zeynep Degirmencioglu.

The name of Pollyanna was changed to "Ayşecik" to cash in on Değirmencioğlu's status in Turkish pop culture with her signature and title role of Ayşecik in the Ayşecik film franchise. This was a common practice in her career as she frequently played the character Ayşecik in other Turkish adaptations of existing films, such as The Wizard of Oz.

The plot of the film is consistent with the Disney adaptation, but certain key features are different, such as the addition of musical numbers and the absence of the prisms. This adaptation does, however, follow the Disney version by having Ayşecik fall from a tree (instead of being hit by a motorcar). Also, Ayse'nin Teyzesi (based on Aunt Polly) is considerably younger in this adaptation, and Ayşecik is about 16, whereas Pollyanna is 11 in the original novel.

1973 serial
The BBC produced a six-part TV serial in 1973 starring Colyton Grammar School pupil Elizabeth Archard as Pollyanna and Elaine Stritch as Aunt Polly. This ran in the Sunday tea-time slot, which often featured reasonably faithful adaptations of classic novels aimed at a family audience, although in this instance it followed the Disney film (and not the original novel) by having Pollyanna injured in a fall from a tree.

1986 TV series
Nippon Animation of Japan released Ai Shoujo Pollyanna Monogatari (The Story of Pollyanna, Girl of Love), a fifty-one episode anime television series that made up the 1986 installment of the studio's World Masterpiece Theater, and had famous singer Mitsuko Horie playing the role of Pollyanna.

1989 film

There was also a modernized made-for-TV musical version made by Disney (originally airing on NBC) in mid-November 1989 with an African-American cast entitled Polly, which later had a sequel (Polly: Coming Home).

2003 film
A 2003 Carlton Television TV film version of Pollyanna starring Amanda Burton as Aunt Polly and Georgina Terry as Pollyanna is very faithful to the book, with one or two minor differences that do not affect the accuracy of the plot. It uses the original characterizations and storylines, but takes place in an English village rather than Vermont (only the scenery and accents show this—the town is still called Beldingsville). Like the book, it ends with Aunt Polly and Dr. Chilton married and Pollyanna walking, but the scene is the actual wedding with Pollyanna back for a visit rather than a letter as in the book.

2018 telenovela

A 2018 Brazilian telenovela version of "Pollyanna" called As Aventuras de Poliana (The Adventures of Poliana) premiered on SBT on May 16. The telenovela stars Sophia Valverde as Poliana. It is directed by Reynaldo Boury.

See also 
 Candide, a 1759 anti-religious satire which parodies Leibnizian optimism.
"Pollyanna" is a song by Green Day. Released in 2021, the song title refers to excessive optimism and may also refer to the main protagonist of the novel.

References

Further reading
Keith, Lois. Take Up Thy Bed and Walk: Death, Disability and Cure in Classic Fiction for Girls. Routledge: 2001.

External links

 
 
 
 
  Publication history, a brief plot summary, and biographical information about the author compiled by the University of Illinois School of Library and Information Science.
 
 

1913 American novels
1913 children's books
American children's novels
American novels adapted into films
American novels adapted into plays
New Hampshire culture
Novels about orphans
American novels adapted into television shows
Novels set in Vermont
Series of children's books